The Ondonga royal family consists of monarch of Ondonga of Namibia, the late King Immanuel Kauluma Elifas, his consorts, legitimate descendants, near relatives and female-line descendants of his great-great-grandmothers. As paramount chief within the Republic of Namibia and pursuant to the preservation of African traditional leadership, the hereditary head of the Ondonga dynasty retains kingly dignity, ethnic leadership, ritual authority and a civil list, reigning and ruling in Ondonga in conjunction with the Traditional Authority Act.

Incumbent and family

The head of the Ondonga royal family was the late Immanuel Kauluma Elifas who had designated Fillemon Shuumbwa Nangolo to be King of the Ondonga nation of Namibia after his death. He was born on 9 June 1978, in Ondonga and approved by the Namibian government to be king of the Ondonga people on 10 June 2019.

Consorts
 Adelheid Gustaf - Nangolo (Queen)

Children

Predecessors

 Nembulungo lyNgwedha, ±1650-1690
 Shindongo shaNamutenya gwa Nguti, 1690-1700 
 Nangombe yaMvula, 1700-1750 (Oshamba)
 Nembungu lyAmutundu, 1750- ca. 1820 (Iinenge)
 Nangolo dAmutenya, ca. 1820-1857 (Ondonga)
 Shipanga shAmukwiita, 1857-1859 
 Shikongo shaKalulu, 1859-1874 (Omandongo)
 Kambonde kaNankwaya, 1874-1883 (Onamungundo)
 Iitana yaNekwiyu, 1883-1884
 Kambonde kaMpingana, 1884-1909 (Western Ondonga, Olukonda)
 Nehale lyaMpingana, 1884-1908 (Eastern Ondonga, Okaloko)
 Kambonde kaNgula, 1909-1912
 Martin Nambala yaKadhikwa, 1912-1942 (Ondjumba)
 Kambonde kaNamene, 1942-1960 (Okaloko)
 Martin Ambala Ashikoto, 1960-1967 (Ontananga)
 Paulus Elifas, (1967-1970) (Omwandi)
 Filemon yElifas lyaShindondola, 1970-1975 (Onamungundo)
 Immanuel Kauluma Elifas, 1975-2019 (Onamungundo)
 Omukwaniilwa Tatekulu Fillemon Shuumbwa Nangolo, 2019–present day

References

African royal families
Ondonga royalty
Lists of monarchs